Eric Steven Lander (born February 3, 1957) is an American mathematician and geneticist who served as the 11th director of the Office of Science and Technology Policy and Science Advisor to the President, serving on the presidential Cabinet. Lander is a professor of biology at the Massachusetts Institute of Technology (MIT), a professor of systems biology at Harvard Medical School, a former member of the Whitehead Institute, and the founding director of the Broad Institute. He is a 1987 MacArthur Fellow and Rhodes Scholar. Lander co-chaired President Barack Obama's Council of Advisors on Science and Technology. Lander announced he would resign from the Biden Administration effective February 18, 2022, after allegations surfaced he had engaged in bullying and abusive conduct directed against his subordinates and other White House staff.

Early life and education
Lander was born in Brooklyn, New York City, to Jewish parents, the son of Rhoda G. Lander, a social studies teacher, and Harold Lander, an attorney. He was captain of the math team at Stuyvesant High School, graduating in 1974 as valedictorian and an International Mathematical Olympiad Silver Medalist for the U.S. He attended and later taught at the Hampshire College Summer Studies in Mathematics program. At age 17, he wrote a paper on quasiperfect numbers for which he won the Westinghouse Science Talent Search.

Lander graduated from Princeton University in 1978 as valedictorian and with a Bachelor of Arts in Mathematics. He completed his senior thesis, "On the structure of projective modules", under John Coleman Moore's supervision. He then attended Wolfson College, Oxford as a Rhodes Scholar, and he wrote his Doctor of Philosophy thesis on algebraic coding theory and symmetric block designs under Peter Cameron's supervision.

Career

Early mathematical career
As a mathematician, Lander studied combinatorics and applications of representation theory to coding theory. He enjoyed mathematics, but did not wish to spend his life in such a "monastic" career. Unsure what to do next, he took a job teaching managerial economics at Harvard Business School.  At the suggestion of his brother, developmental biologist Arthur Lander, he started to look at neurobiology, saying at the time, "because there's a lot of information in the brain". To understand mathematical neurobiology, he felt he had to study cellular neurobiology; this in turn led to studying microbiology and eventually genetics. "When I finally feel I have learned genetics, I should get back to these other problems. But I'm still trying to get the genetics right", Lander said.

Lander later became acquainted with David Botstein, a geneticist at the Massachusetts Institute of Technology (MIT). Botstein was working on a way to unravel how subtle differences in complex genetic systems can become disorders such as cancer, diabetes, schizophrenia, and even obesity. The two collaborated to develop a computer algorithm to analyze the maps of genes. In 1986 Lander joined the Whitehead Institute and became an assistant professor at MIT. He was awarded a MacArthur Fellowship in 1987. In 1990, he founded the Whitehead Institute/MIT Center for Genome Research (WICGR). The WICGR became one of the world's leading centers of genome research, and under Lander's leadership made great progress in developing new methods of analyzing mammalian genomes. It also made important breakthroughs in applying this information to the study of human genetic variation, and formed the basis for the foundation of the Broad Institute—a transformation Lander spearheaded.

Contributions to genomics
Two main groups attempted to sequence the human genome. The first was the Human Genome Project, a loosely organized, publicly funded effort that intended to publish the information it obtained freely and without restrictions. Many research groups from countries all over the world were involved in this effort. The second was undertaken by Celera Genomics, which intended to patent the information obtained and charge subscriptions for use of the sequence data. Established first, the Human Genome Project moved slowly in the early phases as the Department of Energy's role was unclear and sequencing technology was in its infancy. Officially, the Human Genome Project had an eight-year head start before Celera entered the race, though discussions for the Human Genome Project began fourteen years before Celera announced their own project. Because the Human Genome Project was a $3 billion publicly funded venture, the consortia raced to enter as much of the human genome into the public domain as quickly as possible once Celera began work in 1998. This was a change of strategy for the Human Genome Project, because many scientists at the time wanted to establish a more complete copy of the genome, not simply publish the many fragments individually. Lander aggressively pressured Human Genome Project scientists to work longer and faster to publish genome fragments before Celera. Lander himself is now listed on 73 patents and patent applications related to genomics.

In February 2001, both the Human Genome Project and Celera published drafts of the human genome in the scientific journals Nature and Science, respectively. In the Human Genome Project's Nature publication, the Whitehead Institute for Biomedical Research, Center for Genome Research, was listed first, with Lander listed as the first named author.

Leveraging Celera's sequencing and analysis techniques, the Whitehead Institute also made a contribution to the sequencing of the mouse genome, an important step in fully understanding the molecular biology of mice, which are often used as model organisms in studies of everything from human diseases to embryonic development. The WICGR has since sequenced the genomes of Ciona savignyi (sea squirt), the pufferfish, the filamentous fungus Neurospora crassa, and multiple relatives of Saccharomyces cerevisiae, one of the most studied yeasts. The Ciona savignyi genome provides a good system for exploring the evolutionary origins of all vertebrates. Pufferfish have smaller-sized genomes than other vertebrates; as a result, their genomes are "mini" models for vertebrates. The sequencing of the yeasts related to Saccharomyces cerevisiae will facilitate the identification of key gene regulatory elements, some of which may be common to all eukaryotes (including both plant and animal kingdoms).

Lander was the founding editor of the Annual Review of Genomics and Human Genetics. He remained editor till 2004.

Beyond genomics
Sequence data is a list of bases found in a given stretch of DNA. Its value lies in the discoveries and new technologies it allows. For Lander, one of these applications is the study of disease. Lander is the founder and director of the Broad Institute, a collaboration between MIT, Harvard, the Whitehead institute, and affiliated hospitals. Its goal is "to create tools for genome medicine and make them broadly available to the scientific community in order to apply these tools to propel the understanding and treatment of disease". To this end they are studying the variation in the human genome and have led an international effort that has assembled a library of 2.1 million single-nucleotide polymorphisms (SNP). These act as markers or signposts in the genome, allowing the identification of disease susceptibility genes. They hope to construct a map of the human genome using blocks of these SNP called linkage disequilibrium (LD). This map will be of significant help in medical genetics by allowing researchers to link a given condition to a given gene or set of genes using the LD as a marker. This will allow for improved diagnostic procedures. Lander and his colleagues are hoping the LD map will allow them to test the Common Disease-Common Variant hypothesis that states that many common diseases may be caused by a small number of common alleles. For example, 50% of the variance in susceptibility to Alzheimer's disease is explained by the common allele ApoE4. Lander's group has recently discovered an important association that accounts for a large proportion of population risk for adult-onset diabetes.

Lander's most important work may be his development of a molecular taxonomy for cancers. The cancers are grouped according to gene expression and information such as their response to chemotherapy. The division of cancers into homogeneous subgroups will increase understanding of these cancers' molecular origins and help devise more effective therapies. Lander's group has also identified a new type of leukemia, MLL, and a gene that may serve as a target for a new drug.

Teaching
For several years, Lander has co-taught MIT's required undergraduate introductory biology course (7.012) with Robert Weinberg. Since 2013 he has also taught two online courses, "Quantitative Biology Workshop" and "7.00x Introduction to Biology - The Secret of Life" via the EdX platform by working with the MITx Bio group.

Translational ventures
Lander is a founding advisor of Foundation Medicine, a company that aims to bring comprehensive cancer genomic analysis to routine clinical care. He is also a co-founder of Verastem, a biopharmaceutical company focused on discovering and developing drugs to treat cancer by targeting cancer stem cells.

Forensic science and criminal justice

In 1989, Lander provided expert testimony in the New York criminal case People v. Castro. He showed that the then-current method of interpreting DNA evidence was liable to give false positive matches, implicating innocent defendants. Two of the defense attorneys in that case, Peter Neufeld and Barry Scheck, went on to found the Innocence Project, an organization that uses DNA analysis to exonerate wrongly convicted prisoners. Lander is a member of the Innocence Project's board of directors.

Science Advisor to the President

In January 2021, President-elect Joe Biden nominated Lander as Science Advisor to the President and announced that he would elevate the position to a Cabinet-level post. In January 2021, 500 female scientists published an editorial in Scientific American to consider naming someone else to the position, because he was well known within the scientific community for offending women.
His nomination had been held up possibly due to requests for clarification about his having attended two gatherings where Jeffrey Epstein, a wealthy large-scale donor to science who was also a convicted sex offender, was present. On April 29, a confirmation hearing was held in the Senate Committee on Commerce, Science, and Transportation. On May 20, the committee voted to report favorably on the nomination, with five Republican senators voting against. On May 28, 2021, before a Memorial Day recess, his nomination was confirmed by voice vote by the full Senate. Lander was sworn in as director of the Office of Science and Technology Policy on June 2, 2021. He took his oath using a rare 1492 copy of the Pirkei Avot.

On February 7, 2022, Politico reported on a White House investigation in which fourteen current and former Office of Science and Technology Policy staffers accused Lander on February 4 of having bullied and demeaned his subordinates. Lander admitted to the behavior and issued an apology to staff on February 4, his apology includes, "I am devastated that I caused hurt to past and present colleagues by the way in which I have spoken to them... I believe it is not possible to continue effectively in my role, and the work of this office is far too important to be hindered." He later resigned on February 7.

Recognition and service
In 1999, Lander received the Golden Plate Award of the American Academy of Achievement.

In 2004, Lander was named one of Time magazine's 100 most influential people of our time for his work on the Human Genome Project. He has appeared in numerous PBS documentaries about genetics. He was ranked #2 on the MIT150 list of MIT's innovators and ideas.

In December 2008, Lander and Harold E. Varmus were named co-chairs of the Obama administration's Council of Advisors on Science and Technology. In 2012 he received the Dan David Prize.

Lander is a member of the advisory board to the USA Science and Engineering Festival.

In 2013, Lander was awarded the first Breakthrough Prize in Life Sciences. In 2016, Semantic Scholar AI program ranked him #1 on its list of most influential biomedical researchers.

In 2017, Lander received an honoris causa doctorate from the Université catholique de Louvain. Also in 2017, he received the William Allan Award from the American Society of Human Genetics.

In 2019, he served on the Life Sciences jury for the Infosys Prize. In 2020, Pope Francis appointed him a member of the Pontifical Academy of Science. In 2021, Lander, who holds many patents, disclosed ownership of assets worth more than $45 million.

References

External links

 Lander at MIT
 MIT Broad Institute Bio
 

|-

1957 births
20th-century American mathematicians
21st-century American mathematicians
21st-century American biologists
21st-century American economists
20th-century American Jews
21st-century American Jews
American Rhodes Scholars
Annual Reviews (publisher) editors
Biden administration cabinet members
Biotechnologists
Broad Institute people
Economists from New York (state)
Fellows of the AACR Academy
Genetic epidemiologists
Harvard Business School faculty
Human Genome Project scientists
International Mathematical Olympiad participants
Jewish American members of the Cabinet of the United States
Jewish American scientists
Living people
MacArthur Fellows
Massachusetts Institute of Technology School of Science  faculty
Mathematicians from New York (state)
Mathematics popularizers
Members of the United States National Academy of Sciences
Princeton University alumni
Scientists from Brooklyn
Stuyvesant High School alumni
Whitehead Institute faculty
Members of the National Academy of Medicine
Directors of the Office of Science and Technology Policy